Super Extra Bonus Party are a Choice Music Prize winning indie-electronica band, formed in November 2005 and based in Kildare, Ireland. Their music spanned various genres such as electronica, indie and hip hop. Their debut album Super Extra Bonus Party LP was released to widespread critical acclaim, winning the 2007 Choice Music Prize and considered "the most inventive Irish album this decade."

Aside from headline shows, the band played with the likes of The Go! Team, Cadence Weapon, Bonde do Rolê, Subtle and Alec Empire as well as slots at Electric Picnic in 2007 and 2008. The band's second album, Night Horses, was released in 2009. Super Extra Bonus Party announced an indefinite hiatus in 2011. They returned with new single 'Switzerland' on 17 November 2017 with the promise of a new album due in late 2018.

History 
The band first started as a duo, with Cormac and Mike producing electronic music under the moniker Illegal Kids.

Their songs appeared on two compilations in 2004: Eklectra on Elusive Recordings and Wooden Educational on Alphabet Set.

In 2005, Stephen joined the group, the group's name was changed to Super Extra Bonus Party and a demo was put together. Shortly afterwards, Brazilian MC Rodrigo and Gavin joined the band and they began to work on a debut album.

The debut album was written, recorded and produced in the house where the band lived together in late 2006 and early 2007.

It features collaborations with various Irish musicians, such as Nina Hynes, Paul O' Reilly (Channel One), Iain Defector (Kill City Defectors) and human beatbox White Noise.

After the release of Super Extra Bonus Party LP, the line-up was supplemented by Steve Conlan on guitar and Cons Henry on drums, which also expanded their live show significantly.

In late 2007, Cons Henry left the band to concentrate on other commitments. Gary Clarke was brought in as a replacement.

In January 2008, the band were nominated for the Choice Music Prize for their debut album, which they won on 27 February 2008.

The band released a remix album entitled Appetite for Reconstruction for free download which features remixes from Cadence Weapon, Jape and Nouveaunoise amongst others in late 2008.

In May 2009, they released their second album, Night Horses, which features contributions from Cadence Weapon, Mr. Lif, Heathers, May Kay of Fight Like Apes, R.S.A.G, Captain Moonlight, Ann Scott and White Noise.

In June 2011, Super Extra Bonus Party announced an indefinite hiatus.

In March 2015, a picture was posted of the group together and an announcement was made that the band had reconvened. They are currently at work on the follow up to Night Horses with the working title of 'Led Zeppelin Vol.4'

In November 2017, they released 'Switzerland' as a digital single on 045 Recordings.

Discography

Albums

Compilation albums
Appetite for Reconstruction (Remix LP) (2008)

EPs
Super Extra Bonus Party EP (2006)
Everything Flows EP 12" (2008)

External links 
 Website
 "Propeller" music video
 "Everything Flows" music video
 "Remix Album Appetite for Reconstruction & Launch Night Review"
 "SEBP Announce New Album"
 SEBP Single Giveaway!

References

Irish alternative rock groups
Musical groups established in 2005
Newbridge, County Kildare